This is a list of alpine lakes. 

 Ansoo Lake, Pakistan
 Changu Lake, India
 Chitta Katha Lake, Pakistan 

 Crater Lake, Oregon, USA
 Chandra Taal, India
 Dudipatsar Lake, Pakistan 

 Gangabal Lake, India
 Garibaldi Lake, British Columbia, Canada
 Gurudongmar Lake, India
 Handarap Lake, Pakistan 	
 Heaven Lake, North Korea/China
 Issyk Kul, Kyrgyzstan
 Lulusar Lake, Pakistan 
 Karambar Lake, Pakistan 
 Katora Lake, Pakistan 
 Lake Sevan, Armenia
 Lake Baikal, Russia
  Lake Louise, Alberta, Canada
 Lake Saiful Muluk, Pakistan

 Lake Tahoe, California/Nevada USA 
 Lake Titicaca, Peru/Bolivia
 Lake Van, Turkey
 Moraine Lake, Alberta, Canada
 Naltar Lake, Pakistan 
 
 Paristan Lake, Pakistan 
 Pangong Tso, India
 Phoksundo Lake, Nepal
 Peyto Lake, Alberta, Canada
 Rara Lake, Nepal
 Rush Lake, Pakistan
 Ratti Gali Lake, Pakistan 
 Tarsar Lake, India
 Saral Lake, Pakistan 
 
 Sheosar Lake, Pakistan
 Tenaya Lake, California
 Urmia Lake, Iran
 Yellowstone Lake, Wyoming, USA

alpine